{{Infobox concert
| concert_tour_name = World on Fire World Tour
| image = File:2015 RiP Slash feat Myles Kennedy and the Conspirators - by 2eight - 8SC2803.jpg
| image_caption = Slash and Myles Kennedy at the Rock im Park Festival in 2015
| image_size    = 250px
| album = World on Fire
| location = America, Europe, Asia and Oceania
| artist = Slash featuring Myles Kennedy and The Conspirators
| start_date = July 9, 2014
| end_date = November 24, 2015
| number_of_legs = 10
| number_of_shows = 152
 | last_tour = Apocalyptic Love World Tour (2012–13)
 | this_tour = World on Fire World Tour  (2014–2015)
 | next_tour = 'Living The Dream Tour  (2018–2019)
}}
The World on Fire World Tour is the third concert tour by lead guitarist Slash as a solo artist, which started in July 2014 and was scheduled to resume in late 2015, in support of Slash's third solo album World on Fire. The tour features the same backing band that performed with Slash during his two last tours, billed as "Slash featuring Myles Kennedy and The Conspirators", featuring Myles Kennedy handling lead vocal, bassist Todd Kerns, drummer Brent Fitz and rhythm guitarist Frank Sidoris.

The setlist during the tour includes songs from Guns N' Roses, Velvet Revolver and Slash's Snakepit beside songs from Slash's solo albums, spawning the DVD Live at the Roxy''.

Tour dates

A Supporting Aerosmith

Personnel

Main band

 Slash – lead guitar, slide guitar, acoustic guitar, backing vocals
 Myles Kennedy – lead vocals, rhythm guitar, acoustic guitar
 Todd Kerns – bass, backing and lead vocals (on selected songs)
 Brent Fitz – drums, backing vocals
 Frank Sidoris – rhythm guitar, acoustic guitar, backing vocals

Live guests
During the tour, the following musicians joined Slash and the band on stage:
 Duff McKagan – bass, backing vocals "It's So Easy" and "Paradise City" (Gorge 2014 / Buenos Aires 2015)
 Gilby Clarke – rhythm guitar on "Paradise City" and "Mr. Brownstone" (Buenos Aires 2015 / Porto Alegre 2015 / São Paulo 2015 / Clark 2015)
 Phill Campbell – guitar on "Hey-Hey-Hey-Hey!" and "Ace of Spades" (Birmingham 2014)
 Kimberly Nichole – lead vocals on "Hey Joe" (NYC 2015)
 Michael Monroe – lead vocals on "We're All Gonna Die" and "Dr. Alibi" (Helsinki)
 Doda – lead vocals on "Sweet Child o' Mine" (Łódź 2015)

References

External links
Official website

2014 concert tours
2015 concert tours
Slash (musician) concert tours